The American College of Radiology (ACR), founded in 1923, is a professional medical society representing nearly 40,000 diagnostic radiologists, radiation oncologists, interventional radiologists, nuclear medicine physicians and medical physicists.

The ACR has 54 chapters in the United States, Canada and the Council of Affiliated Regional Radiation Oncology Societies (CARROS).

Medical imaging accreditation
The ACR has accredited more than 39,000 medical imaging facilities in 10 imaging modalities since 1987, including:
 Breast MRI
 Breast Ultrasound
 Computed Tomography
 Mammography
 Magnetic Resonance Imaging
 Nuclear Medicine
 Positron Emission Tomography
 Radiation Oncology Practice
 Stereotactic Breast Biopsy
 Ultrasound

ACR Appropriateness Criteria
The ACR Appropriateness Criteria (ACR AC) are evidence-based guidelines that assist referring physicians and other providers in making the most appropriate imaging or treatment decision for a specific clinical condition. The ACR AC includes 178 diagnostic imaging and interventional radiology topics with 912 clinical variants and over 1,550 clinical scenarios.

ACR AC are available to all physicians via ACR Select, a module contained within CareSelect Imaging.

In creating the ACR AC, the ACR Task Force on Appropriateness Criteria incorporated attributes for developing acceptable medical practice guidelines used by the Agency for Healthcare Research and Quality (AHRQ), as designed by the Institute of Medicine.

Data registries
The ACR National Radiology Data Registry (NRDR) develops benchmarks and comparisons to help imaging facilities improve quality of patient care with its collection of registries related to a range of radiological procedures.  The registries include:
 CT Colonography (CTC) Registry
 Dose Index Registry (DIR)
 Interventional Radiology (IR) Registry
 General Radiology Improvement Database (GRID)
 Lung Cancer Screening Registry (LCSR)
 National Mammography Database (NMD)

NRDR was approved as a Qualified Clinical Data Registry (QCDR) for 2018 MIPS Reporting.

Specialized medical education 
 ACR Education Center – located in Reston, VA, offers specialized mini-fellowships in more than a dozen clinical areas.
 American Institute for Radiologic Pathology (AIRP) – The AIRP conducts five courses for radiology residents and fellows, and seven categorical courses for practicing radiologists and other physicians each year in Silver Spring, MD.
 Radiology Leadership Institute (RLI) – The RLI offers leadership and business management training specifically for radiologists.

Publications 
 The Journal of the American College of Radiology (JACR) – The official journal of ACR.
 ACR Bulletin –  a monthly publication covering topics on radiology.

Collaborations 
The ACR provides patient information through the website Radiologyinfo.org, co-produced by the Radiological Society of North America, to help patients understand how various radiology procedures and radiation therapy are performed.

Imaging 3.0 
ACR's Imaging 3.0 initiative is a roadmap to transition the practice of radiology from volume-based to value-based care. Four main focus areas of Imaging 3.0 include;
 Integrated service environment – Integrating radiologists in the patient care continuum i.
 New healthcare organizations – Participate in the design, maintenance, and management of these new health care organizations, such as PCMHs, ACOs, and those yet to be formed.
 Patient-focused care – Ensure patients understand their options regarding medical imaging, offer radiology reports in terms, and provide basic education on imaging exams and preparation for them.
 A network of tools and services – Expert advice from leading radiology, technology, and business consultants.

See also 
 American Board of Radiology

References 

Medical associations based in the United States
Radiology organizations
Medical and health organizations based in Virginia
Organizations established in 1923
1923 establishments in the United States